A list of football clubs in the Republic of the Congo:
For a complete list see :Category:Football clubs in the Republic of the Congo
Elecsport  (Bouansa)
AC Morandzambé (Brazzaville)
Ajax de Ouenzé (Brazzaville)
AS Mbako  (Brazzaville)
AS Police (Brazzaville)
CARA Brazzaville (Brazzaville)
Club 57 Tourbillon (Brazzaville)
CSMD Diables Noirs (Brazzaville)
Étoile du Congo (Brazzaville)
FC Cuvette (Brazzaville)
FC Kondzo (Brazzaville)
Inter Club (Brazzaville)
JS Talangaï (Brazzaville)
Kotoko MFOA  (Brazzaville)
Patronage Sainte-Anne (Brazzaville)
Saint Michel de Loukoléla (Brazzaville)
Saint Michel de Ouenzé (Brazzaville)
Tongo FC Jambon (Brazzaville)
Union Sport  (Brazzaville)
AC Léopards (Dolisie)
ASICO FC (Dolisie)
Abeilles FC  (Pointe-Noire)
AS Cheminots (Pointe-Noire)
AS Ponténégrine (Pointe-Noire)
CS La Mancha (Pointe-Noire)
EPB  (Pointe-Noire)
FC Bilombé (Pointe-Noire)
JS Bougainvillées (Pointe-Noire)
Muni Sport (Pointe-Noire)
Nico-Nicoyé (Pointe-Noire)
Olympic de Nkayi (Pointe-Noire)
Olympique Vision (Pointe-Noire)
Pigeon Vert (Pointe-Noire)
US Saint-Pierre (Pointe-Noire)
Vita Club Mokanda (Pointe-Noire)
Le CFA Club de Football d'Angnha (Brazzaville)

 
Football clubs
Congo
Football clubs